"Love to See You Cry" is the fourth single released from Spanish singer-songwriter Enrique Iglesias' second English-language studio album, Escape. The song was written by Iglesias, Mark Taylor, Paul Barry and Steve Torch, and produced by Mark Taylor for Metro/Brian Rawling Productions.

The single was released on 3 June 2002 in Europe and peaked at number 12 on the UK Singles Chart. Worldwide, the song reached number one in the Czech Republic and peaked inside the top 20 in Canada, France, Greece, Ireland, Portugal, Romania, and Spain. The music video features Mexican model Elsa Benitez playing opposite Iglesias.

Track listings

Spanish CD single
 "Love to See You Cry" (album version) – 4:05
 "Love to See You Cry" (Pippi & Chus Mediterranean vocal mix) – 9:03
 "Love to See You Cry" (Pippi & Chus Mediterranean dub mix) – 7:14
 "Love to See You Cry" (Pippi & Chus Mediterranean radio edit) – 4:18

European CD single
 "Love to See You Cry" (album version) – 4:05
 "Escape" (Giorgio Moroder and Fernando Garibay radio mix) – 4:04

UK CD1
 "Love to See You Cry" (album version) – 4:05
 "Sad Eyes" (album version) – 4:08
 "Love to See You Cry" (Metro Mix) – 6:19
 "Love to See You Cry" (CD-ROM video)

UK CD2
 "Love to See You Cry" (album version) – 4:05
 "Experiencia Religiosa" (album version) – 5:28
 "Only You" (video)

UK cassette single
 "Love to See You Cry" (album version) – 4:05
 "Sad Eyes" (album version) – 4:08

Australian CD single
 "Love to See You Cry" (album version) – 4:05
 "Escape" (Giorgio Moroder and Fernando Garibay radio mix) – 4:04
 "Escape" (7th District radio mix) – 3:21
 "Love to See You Cry" (Metro Mix) – 6:19
 "Escape" (video) – 3:30

Credits and personnel
Credits are lifted from the Escape album booklet.

Studios
 Vocals engineered at Circle House (Miami, Florida)
 Mastered at Bernie Grundman Mastering Studio (Hollywood, California)

Personnel

 Enrique Iglesias – writing, vocals
 Paul Barry – writing, background vocals
 Steve Torch – writing
 Mark Taylor – writing, electric guitar, bass, drums, percussion, production, mixing
 Sylvia Mason-James – background vocals
 Adam Phillips – acoustic guitar
 Carlos Paucar – vocal engineering
 Jong Uk Yoon – assistant engineering
 Ivy Skoff – production coordination
 Brian Gardner – mastering

Charts

Weekly charts

Year-end charts

Release history

References

2001 songs
2002 singles
Enrique Iglesias songs
Number-one singles in the Czech Republic
Song recordings produced by Mark Taylor (record producer)
Songs written by Enrique Iglesias
Songs written by Mark Taylor (record producer)
Songs written by Paul Barry (songwriter)
Songs written by Steve Torch